Konstantinos Papadopoulos may refer to:
 Konstantinos Papadopoulos (footballer, born 2000)
 Konstantinos Papadopoulos (footballer, born 1976)